Lagerkvist, Lagerqvist or Lagerquist is a Swedish surname. Notable people with the surname include:

 Pär Lagerkvist (1891–1974), Swedish author
 Claes-Ingvar Lagerkvist (born 1944), Swedish astronomer
 Margareta Sofia Lagerqvist (1771–1800), Swedish opera singer and stage actress
 Anna Lagerquist (born 1993), Swedish handball player
 David Lagerquist, editor-in-chief of CLOAD Magazine

Fictional characters
 Petra Johanna Lagerkvist, a fictional character from the video game series Arcana Heart

See also 
 2875 Lagerkvist, a main-belt asteroid

Swedish-language surnames